Feminization laryngoplasty is a surgical procedure that results in the increase of the pitch of a patient, making the voice sound higher and more feminine. It is a type of voice feminization surgery (VFS) and an alternative to vocal therapy. Feminization laryngoplasty is performed as a treatment for both transgender women and non-binary people as part of their gender transition, and women with androphonia. The surgery can be categorized into two main steps: Incision and vocal fold modification followed by thyrohyoid elevation. Risks and complications include granuloma, dysphonia and tracheostomy. Patients are recommended to follow perioperative management such as voice rest to hasten recovery.

Typically, the surgical procedure could shift the lower limit of the patients' vocal range upward, with little to no effect on the higher end of the vocal range. Other than pitch change, the operation could also diminish the masculine neck profile caused by "Adam's apple" after the removal of anterior cartilage, thus achieving a more feminine neck appearance.

Background

Transgender woman
Transgender women make up most of the patients of feminization laryngoplasty. During puberty, testosterone, a male sex hormone produced by the testes, causes the diameter of the larynx to increase and the vocal folds to thicken and lengthen. This change is irreversible even with the help of feminizing hormone therapy. The fundamental and resonant frequency of their voice decreases and they no longer match to the desired vocal range that suits their preferred gender identity.

Non-binary people
Women with an abnormally low voice and gender non-conforming individuals may also seek feminization laryngoplasty. However, the target pitch for non-binary people may be different from transgender women. For instance, some would hope to achieve an androgynous voice rather than a completely feminine voice. Therefore, laryngologists should work closely with patients to tailor to their personal needs to maximize satisfaction.

Voice therapy
Individuals who sought vocal alterations are first recommended to undergo voice therapy to generate a desirable vocal pitch and resonance. Some individuals could substantially achieve a more feminine voice by adapting to a new habitual coordination of muscles in their vocal cords. However, results vary greatly from person to person and often require an active effort to maintain. A persistent effort of using a more feminine voice could lead to straining and other pathological issues in vocal cords. Surgical means of voice feminization such as feminization laryngoplasty can be an alternative to vocal therapy when effects from training alone are unsatisfactory, allowing patients to permanently modify their comfortable speaking pitch and resonance.

It is estimated that about 1% of transgender woman have opted for surgical procedure of voice feminization, while a larger proportion of transgender woman (14%) opted for non-surgical means of voice feminization (i.e. voice therapy).

History 
Transgender surgery in general has gained its initial momentum in the early 1950s after the attention brought by American transgender woman Christine Jorgensen. Sexual reassignment surgeries have seen an exponential increase in public awareness during that period of time. However, it was not until a few decades ago had voice feminization garnered its own recognition from public audience.

Popularisation of voice feminization
Previously, gender affirmation surgery has put great emphasis on genital conformation only. In the last few decades, as the interpretations of gender identity in society shifts, gender affirmation surgery has expanded to the territories of secondary sex characteristics, in a way that voice feminization has seen unprecedented attention. Study notes that throughout the decades, there has been an increasing trend of emphasis on social recognition (i.e. interacting with other people in the community under their own preferred gender identity) rather than sexual recognition alone. Several cosmetic surgeons have claimed that most of their patients are satisfied with alterations on secondary sexual characteristics and are not tempted to seek additional genital surgery.

Traditional techniques
The first experimental study to surgically raise the speaking pitch was performed by Japanese otorhinolaryngologist Kazutomo Kitajima and his colleagues in 1979. They together discovered the inverse linear relationship between the vocal pitch and the distance between the thyroid cartilage and cricoid cartilage. Based on this principle, the first surgical procedure for voice feminization, cricothyroid approximation (CTA) was developed to achieve pitch increase by reducing the separation between the two cartilages. To this date, this procedure remains the most popular among transgender women seeking surgical voice feminization.  Other surgical solutions were also developed, including Web Glottoplasty (also known as anterior web glottal formation), laser assisted voice adjustment (LAVA) and laser reduction glottoplasty (LRG). However the results are often unsatisfactory due to the unnatural falsetto quality of the voice.

Modern technique 
The concept of feminization laryngoplasty originated from the open laryngoplasty technique proposed by cosmetic surgeon Somyos Kunachak. The first operation was then performed by James P. Thomas in 2003. As opposed to previous efforts, feminization laryngoplasty results in a more significant and long-lasting pitch increase along with a more feminine voice quality. The function of cricothyroid muscle is also preserved, allowing the use of the falsetto range when needed. In addition, compared to other surgeries, feminization laryngoplasty could be undergone as one single surgery for thyroid chondroplasty to reduce the prominence of the "Adam's apple", while the other solutions had to perform chondroplasty separately.

The first few surgeries were performed under local anesthesia. However, general anesthesia is now preferred over local anesthesia to prevent patients from attempting to talk during the surgery, which may lead to complications such as the tearing of sutures.

Procedure

Presurgical management
Before the operation, antibiotics such as clindamycin and ceftriaxone are administered intravenously to reduce surgical infection. Dexamethasone is also given to reduce edema.

To better anaylze the change in voice pitch and quality after the surgical operation, voice recordings are also taken before and after the laryngoplasty.

Incision and vocal fold modification

General anesthesia would be administered beforehand. A 5 cm long horizontal incision would then be made at a skin crease above the thyroid notch, allowing the postoperative scar to be hidden under the crease. After flaps have been created under the platysma, the strap muscles would be separated along the midline to expose the thyroid cartilage. This allows a strip of the anterior thyroid cartilage to be removed using electrocautery to effectively reduce the contour of the Adam's apple and the diameter of the laryngeal opening.

A quarter of the anterior false folds would also be removed to further reduce the diameter of the upper larynx and to provide a better view of the true vocal folds. Subsequently, up to 50% of the anterior vocal folds is removed and the length of pharynx is shortened to raise the speaking pitch. The overall size of glottal region is also reduced, which diminishes the thyroid notch.

Thyrohyoid elevation
By elevating the thyrohyoid muscle, the distance between the thyroid cartilage and the hyoid bone can be decreased.

At last, eight holes are drilled on the thyroid cartilage and hyoid bone for the placement of sutures and screws, securing the structure of the larynx. The strap muscles are then reattached and the skin is closed with sutures.

Postsurgical management
Following surgery completion, patients are prescribed acetaminophen with narcotic pain medication for pain relief and cefpodoxime or levofloxacin for 7 days to minimize infection.

Risks and complications 

After feminization laryngoplasty, most patients would experience a drop in voice volume and some may experience a decreased vocal pitch. Continuity of range might also be negatively affected. Therefore, the surgery might be less suited for vocal performance professionals. Instead, an alternative procedure, Vocal Fold Shortening and Retrodisplacement of the Anterior Commissure (VFSRAC) is generally recommended as it preserves the ability to sing.

Granuloma in the vocal cords is also a possible complication, which may cause a soft and whispery voice. The granuloma should eventually be coughed out, or in some case be removed manually. Dysphonia is another common symptom in the first two months of recovery, but the issue gradually resolves in most patients. Further treatment or revision surgery might be needed for some patients with serious unresolved sound hoarseness after extended periods of recovery. If the vocal cords heal with asymmetrical tension, laser treatment is generally required to correct the defect.

In some rare cases, severe swelling could lead to difficulty in breathing, which may require tracheostomy to bypass the area of obstruction.

Post-operative care 
Following feminization laryngoplasty, patients are usually discharged without the need for overnight stay. Exceptions would be made when complications have occurred, during which the patient would have to stay in a hospital for up to a week.

Complete voice rest after the surgery is also necessary for fast healing as the vocal cords are only supported by a few sutures. Those who have undergone the procedure are advised to have vocal rest for at least 2 weeks, no aerobic activity for 3 weeks and no weight lifting for a month to give time for scar tissue to develop and support the larynx. It is also advised to refrain from having surgery requiring intubation for at least 3 months.

To maximize the effects of the surgery and to adapt to the new feminine voice, patients are also highly recommended to undergo vocal therapy, during which patients could learn to feminize their voice intonation, volume, resonance and non-verbal communication such as gesture and articulation.

For patients who are still unsatisfied with the pitch increase after the surgery, revision surgery could be considered to improve results. However, a revision is generally not recommended to patient with medical records of voice surgery prior to feminization laryngoplasty.

See also

 Transgender voice therapy
 List of transgender-related topics
 Adrenogenital syndrome
 Speech pathology

References 

Laryngology
Gender-affirming surgery (male-to-female)
Human voice